Timbé (also spelled Tinbé) is a town in central Ivory Coast. It is a sub-prefecture of Katiola Department in Hambol Region, Vallée du Bandama District.

Timbé was a commune until March 2012, when it became one of 1126 communes nationwide that were abolished.

In 2014, the population of the sub-prefecture of Timbé was 11,307 11,307 11,307.

Villages
The 9 villages of the sub-prefecture of Timbé and their population in 2014 are:
 Attienkaha (999)
 Kabolo (1 354)
 Kafigué (367)
 Kassemé (1 634)
 Koffissiokaha (1 716)
 Ourougbankaha (255)
 Timbé (2 247)
 Toumboho (1 328)
 Yékolo (1 407)

Notes

Sub-prefectures of Hambol
Former communes of Ivory Coast